Rupert Ronald Bradley (1 October 1881 – 25 September 1976) was an Australian rules footballer who played with Carlton and Fitzroy in the Victorian Football League (VFL).

Notes

External links 

Rupe Bradley's profile at Blueseum

Australian rules footballers from Victoria (Australia)
Carlton Football Club players
Fitzroy Football Club players
1881 births
1976 deaths